Group A of the 2009 Fed Cup Europe/Africa Zone Group II was one of two pools in Group II of the Americas zone of the 2009 Fed Cup. Four teams competed in a round robin competition, with the top team advancing to Group I for 2010.

Chile vs. Panama

Mexico vs. Peru

Chile vs. Peru

Mexico vs. Panama

Chile vs. Mexico

Panama vs. Peru

  placed first in this group and thus advanced to Group I for 2010, where they placed fifth overall.

See also
Fed Cup structure

References

External links
 Fed Cup website

2009 Fed Cup Americas Zone